Francis A. Hopkins (1853–1918) was a U.S. Representative from Kentucky.

Francis or Frank Hopkins may also refer to:
F. R. C. Hopkins (Francis Rawdon Chesney Hopkins, 1849–1916), Australian playwright
Sir Francis Hopkins, 1st Baronet (1756–1814) of the Hopkins baronets
Sir Francis Hopkins, 2nd Baronet (1813–1860) of the Hopkins baronets
Frances Anne Hopkins (1838–1919), English painter
Frank Hopkins (1865–1951), American professional horseman
Frank Hopkins (Royal Navy officer) (1910–1990), officer in the Royal Navy
Frank Hopkins (cricketer) (1875–1930), English cricketer
Frank Hopkins (footballer) (1909–1960), Australian rules footballer
Frank E. Hopkins (1863–1933), American church music composer, book printer, and politician from New York